The canton of Puy-l'Évêque is an administrative division of the Lot department, southern France. Its borders were modified at the French canton reorganisation which came into effect in March 2015. Its seat is in Puy-l'Évêque.

It consists of the following communes:
 
Les Arques
Cassagnes
Duravel
Floressas
Frayssinet-le-Gélat
Goujounac
Grézels
Les Junies
Lacapelle-Cabanac
Lagardelle
Lherm
Mauroux
Montcabrier
Montcléra
Pescadoires
Pomarède
Porte-du-Quercy
Prayssac
Puy-l'Évêque
Saint-Caprais
Saint-Martin-le-Redon
Sérignac
Soturac
Touzac
Vire-sur-Lot

References

Cantons of Lot (department)